Clancy Edwards (born August 9, 1955) is a retired track and field sprinter from the United States. He was considered one of the best sprinters in the world between 1974 and 1978. He won the 200 metres at the 1977 IAAF World Cup, the most important meet of that year, defeating future World Record holder Pietro Mennea.

While in high school, he ran for Santa Ana High School  His 21.32 (converted from a hand time of 21.2) for 220 yards winning the 1973 CIF California State Meet was the best time in Orange County, California for twelve years.  He was also 2nd in the 100-yard dash.

Edwards began his collegiate career at Cal Poly in 1974, running for their track team, the Cal Poly Mustangs (where he won titles under the tutelage of coach Steve Simmons), and Santa Ana Junior College in 1975. He left there citing personal problems and missed a year of college in 1976. He also missed out on the 1976 Summer Olympics because of injury.

In 1977 he transferred as a junior to the University of Southern California (USC).  While at USC he was one of the best sprinters in the world, helping them to the Pac-8 collegiate championship.

He was ranked (see below) in the American top ten at 200 metres five times between 1974 and 1979 including #1 in 1977 and 1978. Worldwide those rankings were not much different, ranking #1 in 1978 and #3 in 1977 behind Mennea and Olympic Champion Don Quarrie. And he was #2 worldwide in 1978 at 100 metres.

Edwards' fastest time over 100 metres was 10.07 seconds, set at Eugene in June 1978. In that year, Edwards achieved the remarkable 'double-double' of winning the 100 and 200 m events at both the NCAA (United States collegiate) and AAU (United States National) Championships. He was the first to do this since Hal Davis in 1943.  That same year he also recorded the world's best year performance in the men's 200 metres at the dual meet against cross-town rival UCLA in Westwood, Los Angeles, clocking 20.03 on April 29, 1978. In both 1977 and 1978 he was awarded the Pac-10 Track athlete of the year.

Also in 1978, Edwards ran the anchor leg of a University of Southern California team (with Joel Andrews, James Sanford and William Mullins) that broke the world record in 4 × 200 m relay event with a time of 1.20.26 at Tempe, Arizona on 27 May. They broke the record even though they came second in the race. The team that won from the Tobias Striders track team was multi-national and so was not eligible to hold the record (that team of Guy Abrahams, Michael Simmons, Don Quarrie and James Gilkes recorded a time of 1.20.23.)

Injury ruined his 1979 season.
The following year, the United States boycott of the 1980 Olympics meant he lacked the motivation to re-find his best form and to carry on with his track career post-1980 onto the next Olympics.

Track and field rankings
Edwards was ranked among the best in the US and the world in the 100 yard/100 metre and 200 yard/200 metre sprint events in the period 1974-79, according to the votes of the experts of Track and Field News.

See also 

 Track and Field News Interview with Clancy Edwards by Jon Hendershott, November 1978.

References

External links
 1978 Year Rankings
 Statistics
 1975 Pan American 4 x 100 metres relay final

1955 births
Living people
American male sprinters
Track and field athletes from Phoenix, Arizona
Sportspeople from Santa Ana, California
Track and field athletes from California
Athletes (track and field) at the 1975 Pan American Games
Pan American Games gold medalists for the United States
Pan American Games medalists in athletics (track and field)
Universiade medalists in athletics (track and field)
Universiade gold medalists for the United States
USC Trojans men's track and field athletes
USA Outdoor Track and Field Championships winners
Medalists at the 1977 Summer Universiade
Medalists at the 1975 Pan American Games